Anne Murray / Glen Campbell is an album by American singer Glen Campbell and Canadian singer Anne Murray, released in 1971 (see 1971 in music).  The album contained both new material, and duet versions of songs each artist had recorded individually (Campbell's "By the Time I Get to Phoenix" and Murray's "Bring Back the Love"), as well as an early version of "You're Easy to Love", which later became a hit for  Hank Snow, the standard "Canadian Sunset", and Brotherhood of Man's 1970 hit  "United We Stand".

The first single released from the album was a medley of "By The Time I get to Phoenix" (sung by Campbell) and "I Say a Little Prayer" (sung by Murray). The album peaked at No.12 on the Canadian RPM album chart on 18 March 1972.

Track listing 

Side 1:

 "You're Easy To Love" (Dave Burgess) - 2:05
 "Medley" (3:15)
 "I Say a Little Prayer" (Burt Bacharach, Hal David)
 "By The Time I Get To Phoenix" (Jimmy Webb)
 "We All Pull the Load" (Bill Graham) - 3:05
 "Canadian Sunset" (Eddie Heywood, Norman Gimbel) - 3:00
 "Bring Back the Love" (Brent Titcomb, Richard Miller) - 2:55

Side 2:

 "United We Stand" (Tony Hiller, Peter Simons) - 2:42
 "Love Story (You & Me)" (Randy Newman) - 3:53
 "Ease Your Pain" (Hoyt Axton) - 3:39
 "Let Me Be the One" (Ed Penney, Jr., John Domurad) - 2:37
 "My Ecstasy" (Dallas Frazier) - 2:28

Personnel 
 Glen Campbell - vocals, acoustic guitar, electric guitar
 Anne Murray - vocals
 Bill Graham - bass guitar

Production 
 Executive Producer - Al Coury
 Producers - Al De Lory, Brian Ahern
 Arranged by Marty Paich, Rick Wilkins

Charts 
Album - Billboard (United States)

Singles - Billboard (United States)

References 

Anne Murray albums
Glen Campbell albums
1971 albums
Albums arranged by Marty Paich
Albums produced by Brian Ahern (producer)
Capitol Records albums
Albums recorded at Capitol Studios
Vocal duet albums